Futebol Clube de Luanda is one of the most traditional football clubs in Luanda. Founded on January 30, 1933, as an affiliate to Portugal's F.C. Porto, the club has been inactive since independence with only few minor underage training activities taking place. The club was the legitimate owner of the Estádio da Cidadela, having inaugurated it on June 10, 1972, before it was nationalized shortly after independence.

The club has been long without proper management and has been run by secretary general Alberto de Almeida and board member Roberto Brooks.

Former prominent athletes include former president José Eduardo dos Santos and Angola's football giant Ndunguidi Daniel.

See also
 Girabola
 Gira Angola

References

F.C. Luanda
F.C. Luanda
F.C. Luanda